The McClaine House is a historic building located in Guttenberg, Iowa, United States.  This two-story brick structure has historically been a combination residence and commercial building.  Sanborn maps list the commercial space as housing: a barber shop (1886), cigar factory (1902), and swelling (1928).  The second floor is four bays wide, while the main floor is three bays.  The middle two windows on the top floor each have a small window located above.  Across the top of the structure there is a plain cornice that is enhanced by modillion blocks.  The building was listed on the National Register of Historic Places in 1984.

References

Vernacular architecture in Iowa
Houses in Guttenberg, Iowa
Houses on the National Register of Historic Places in Iowa
National Register of Historic Places in Clayton County, Iowa